Sutton Bingham Halt railway station served the hamlet of Sutton Bingham, South Somerset, England, from 1860 to 1962 on the West of England line.

History 
The station was opened on 19 July 1860 by the London and South Western Railway. It lost its goods services on 1 April 1960 and the suffix 'Halt' was added to its name on 1 August of the same year, although it was still staffed. It closed on 31 December 1962 but the signal box was still used until 1965.

References 

Former London and South Western Railway stations
Railway stations in Great Britain opened in 1860
Railway stations in Great Britain closed in 1962
1860 establishments in England
1962 disestablishments in England